SportSetter is a Finnish startup focused on a mobile-first fitness discovery and booking service. The company was founded by Niko Karstikko and Trevor Ferguson in Helsinki, Finland in 2012. Users are presented with a curated list of things to do, including last-minute classes and courses, which can be booked direct on the app or via the website. SportSetter now works with the leading employee benefits provider in Finland, Smartum

Background

Niko Karstikko founded SportSetter in 2012. SportSetter provides London, and its other cities.

Activities are selected by hand and the company is working on advanced personalisation algorithms. Things like Facebook likes and the users location, browsing behaviour, tag selection and the browsing behaviour of their friends affect which activities can be highlighted.

Mechanics

Users of SportSetter can login each day and are given a selection of fitness locations, classes, pop-up bootcamps and other activities. Users can then trial activities for free before making a payment. Once a user has found an activity, they can make a purchase through the app or on the website, with users also given the opportunity to share their purchase via social media.

During a TechCrunch interview, it was stated that SportSetter would expand to London in 2016 and launched with over 120 locations across the city.

Initially, SportSetter was only available on Apple's iOS, but was later available on SportSetter.com.

References

Online companies of Finland
Health care companies established in 2012